Brekkvasselv is a village in the municipality of Namsskogan in Trøndelag county, Norway. The village sits at the intersection of European Route E6 and Norwegian County Road 773 which heads east towards Røyrvik municipality. The Nordlandsbanen railway line also runs through the village, stopping at Brekkvasselv Station. The village had 141 residents in 2012.

References

Villages in Trøndelag
Namsskogan